Slobodino is a rural locality (a village) in Voskresenskoye Rural Settlement, Cherepovetsky District, Vologda Oblast, Russia. The population was 3 as of 2002. There are 3 streets.

Geography 
Slobodino is located 34 km north of Cherepovets (the district's administrative centre) by road. Yermolovskaya is the nearest rural locality.

References 

Rural localities in Cherepovetsky District